Armintie Ada (Price) Herrington (born April 3, 1985) is an American professional basketball player who last played for the Washington Mystics  of the Women's National Basketball Association (WNBA). Price, who played collegiately at the University of Mississippi, was drafted third overall by the Chicago Sky in the 2007 WNBA Draft. She was born in Milwaukee, Wisconsin.

High school career
Having moved to Myrtle, Mississippi before high school, the 5'9" (1.75 m) Herrington became a star player at Myrtle High School and received numerous honors, including being named to the Clarion-Ledger's Dandy Dozen (Mississippi's top twelve high school basketball players) as a senior. Herrington averaged 31.0 points, 22.0 rebounds, 6.0 assists and 5.0 steals as a senior and helped lead Myrtle High to the 2003 Class 1A state title and to Class 1A state runner-up finishes as a sophomore and junior. Herrington, who also excelled in track, helped lead Myrtle High to the 2001, 2002 and 2003 Class 1A state championship in track and was a 15-time state champion in track as she won the 100-meter high hurdles, long jump, 200 meters, 4x100-meter relay and 4x200-meter relay her sophomore, junior and senior years. Because of her religion which stated females must wear feminine apparel (skirts), her mother encouraged her to wear a skirt throughout her high school basketball career.

College career
While attending the University of Mississippi in Oxford, Mississippi, Herrington became one of the most decorated athletes of all time playing for coach Carol Ross's Ole Miss Rebels women's basketball team from 2003 to 2007. During her senior year, she averaged a team leading 18.1 points per game, which ranked second in the SEC and 32nd in the NCAA. She also led the team with 146 assists and 118 steals. Her 3.8 steals per game was first in the NCAA and SEC, while she ranked fourth in assists in the SEC with 4.8 per game Herrington is just the fifth player in NCAA history to record over 2,000 points, 1,000 rebounds, 300 assists and 300 steals joining Cheryl Miller, Chamique Holdsclaw, Tamika Catchings and Sophia Young. Price was named 2007 SEC Defensive Player of the Year, becoming the first player in the history of the league to win the award two times. She was a unanimous selection to the 2007 All-SEC First Team by the league coaches.

Ole Miss statistics

Source

WNBA career
The day after her 22nd birthday, Herrington was chosen with the third overall pick by the Chicago Sky, an expansion team of the WNBA. Herrington became the first Ole Miss player selected in the first round of the draft's eleven-year history. She is also just the second Lady Rebel to be selected in the draft (Saundra Jackson was a third-round pick in 2002).  On September 8, 2007 Herrington was named 2007 WNBA Rookie of the Year.

She played for Mallorca in Spain during the 2008–09 WNBA off-season.

Price was traded to the Atlanta Dream on August 12, 2009 in exchange for Tamera Young. In 2014, she joined the Los Angeles Sparks. On February 10, 2015, Herrington signed with the Washington Mystics.

Personal life
Price married Reginald Herrington on October 11, 2009.

See also
 List of NCAA Division I women's basketball career steals leaders

References

External links

Biography courtesy of olemisssports.com
2007 WNBA Draft scouting report
Lady Rebel Armintie Price chosen third overall in 2007 WNBA Draft

 

1985 births
Living people
All-American college women's basketball players
American expatriate basketball people in Spain
American women's basketball players
Atlanta Dream players
Basketball players from Mississippi
Basketball players from Milwaukee
Beşiktaş women's basketball players
Chicago Sky draft picks
Chicago Sky players
Los Angeles Sparks players
Ole Miss Rebels women's basketball coaches
Ole Miss Rebels women's basketball players
People from Union County, Mississippi
Shooting guards
Sportspeople from Milwaukee
Washington Mystics players